Joseph S. Longo (September 22, 1914 – November 29, 1993) was a justice of the Connecticut Supreme Court from 1975 to 1979.

Born in Norwich, Connecticut, Longo "graduated from Norwich Free Academy and then Yale University with a B.A. degree in 1936. He enrolled at the Boston University School of Law, where he received his law degree in 1939. He was admitted to the Connecticut bar that same year". Longo served in the United States Navy during World War II. In the late 1940s he entered politics, serving one term in the Connecticut House of Representatives and three terms in the Connecticut State Senate, including a term as majority leader in the 1955 session. From 1957 to 1959, he served on the state's Common Pleas Court, and from 1959 to 1975 he served on the Superior Court. He was appointed to the state supreme court in 1975 following the retirement of Justice Louis Shapiro, and stepped down from the court in 1979.

References

1914 births
1993 deaths
People from Norwich, Connecticut
Yale University alumni
Boston University School of Law alumni
Members of the Connecticut House of Representatives
Connecticut state senators
Justices of the Connecticut Supreme Court
20th-century American politicians
20th-century American judges